Iovan Iorgovan is a character in Romanian mythology, similar in some ways to Hercules. The legend is present in the Cerna valley of south-western Transylvania. In the legend, Iovan is named "fiu de Ramlean" which can be translated as "son of Rome."

References

Romanian mythology